Laurette Maritz (born 13 January 1964) is a South African professional golfer. She made her debut at the Ladies European Tour in 1988. Maritz earned her BA in Physical Education from the United States International University in San Diego.

Career 
Maritz has won three Ladies European Tour titles in her career in 1988 and in 1990. Apart from LET titles, she has won other tournaments such as South African Women's Open, South African Ladies Masters and Nedbank Women's Masters. She also emerged as runner-up to Karen Lunn at the Open de France Dames in 1997. She represented South Africa at the Women's World Cup of Golf each year from 2005 to 2008.

Professional wins (10)

Ladies European Tour wins (3)
1988 Marbella Open, EMS Masters
1990 Laing Ladies Charity Classic

Other wins (7)
1989 South African Women's Open
1996 South African Women's Open
1997 South African Ladies Masters
2003 South African Ladies Masters, Nedbank Women's Masters
2005 Telkom Women's Classic (South Africa)
2006 Telkom Women's Classic (South Africa)

Team appearances
Amateur
Espirito Santo Trophy (representing South Africa): 1982

Professional
Praia d'El Rey European Cup (representing the Ladies European Tour): 1997

References

External links

 Profile at WPGA
 
 Profile at FoxSports.com

South African female golfers
Ladies European Tour golfers
United States International University alumni
Golfers from Johannesburg
1964 births
Living people